"Keeping up with the Joneses" is an English idiom for trying to match the lifestyle of one's neighbors.

Keeping up with the Joneses may also refer to:

Keeping Up with the Joneses (comics), a comic strip by Pop Momand that originated the phrase
Keeping Up with the Joneses (film), a 2016 American film
Keeping up with the Joneses (TV series), a 2010–2011 Australian reality series
Keepin' Up with the Joneses, a 1958 album by The Jones Brothers: Thad Jones, Hank Jones and Elvin Jones
Keeping Up with the Joneses, a track from the Indiana Jones and the Last Crusade soundtrack